L'Haÿ-les-Roses is a commune in the southern suburbs of Paris, France. L'Haÿ-les-Roses is a sous-préfecture of the Val-de-Marne département, being the seat of the Arrondissement of L'Haÿ-les-Roses.

L'Haÿ-les-Roses owes the second part of its name to a famous rose garden located there.

Name
The commune of L'Haÿ-les-Roses was originally called simply L'Haÿ. The name was recorded for the first time in a charter of Charlemagne in 798 as Laiacum, sometimes also spelt Lagiacum, meaning "estate of Lagius", a Gallo-Roman landowner. The name was later corrupted into Lay, Lahy, and eventually L'Haÿ.

In May 1914 the name of the commune became officially L'Haÿ-les-Roses (meaning "L'Haÿ the roses") in honour of Roseraie du Val-de-Marne, the renowned rose garden created in 1899 by Jules Gravereaux, one of the founders of the Bon Marché department store in Paris.

It is one of the very few French communes with a ÿ in its name.

Population

Education
Primary schools in the commune:
 Seven preschools: Blondeaux, La Roseraie, Garennes, Jardin Parisien, Lallier I, Lallier II, Vallée-aux-Renards
 Seven elementary schools: Blondeaux, Centre, Jardin Parisien A, Jardin Parisien B, Lallier A, Lallier B, Vallée-aux-Renards

Junior high schools:  Collège Pierre de Ronsard and Collège Chevreul.

Senior high schools/sixth-form colleges are in surrounding municipalities:
 Lycée Frédéric Mistral - Fresnes
 Lycée d’enseignement général et technologique Gustave Eiffel - Cachan
 Lycée polyvalent Maximilien Sorre - Cachan
 Lycée polyvalent Pauline Roland Chevilly-Larue - Chevilly-Larue

Notable people
 Arthur Bernède (1871–1937), playwright and novelist
 Michel Eugène Chevreul (1786–1889), chemist
 Marcelle Géniat (1881–1959), actress
 Pierre Gandon (1889–1990), illustrator and engraver of postage stamps.
  (1958), essayist
 Franck Lagorce (1968), automobile race driver
 Cécile Cinélu (1970), athlete
 Clémence Poésy (1982), actress
 Alaixys Romao (1984), footballer

International relations

L'Haÿ-les-Roses is twinned with:
 Omagh, United Kingdom
 Bad Hersfeld, Germany

See also
Communes of the Val-de-Marne department

References

External links

 town council website 
 Roseraie du Val-de-Marne

Communes of Val-de-Marne
Subprefectures in France